Jadden is an unincorporated community in Grant County, Indiana, in the United States.

History
A post office was established at Jadden in 1850, and remained in operation until it was discontinued in 1900. William Jadden served as an early postmaster.

References

Unincorporated communities in Grant County, Indiana
Unincorporated communities in Indiana